Bencroft Hill Meadows is a 5.1 hectare biological Site of Special Scientific Interest some  to the east of the town of Chippenham in Wiltshire, England, notified in 1988. The site is a flora-rich example of unimproved pasture on the Oxford Clay Vale of North Wiltshire which attracts butterflies such as the small copper, small heath and common blue.

Sources
 Natural England citation sheet for the site (accessed 22 March 2022)

External links
 Natural England website (SSSI information)

Sites of Special Scientific Interest in Wiltshire
Sites of Special Scientific Interest notified in 1988
Meadows in Wiltshire